William Grahame may refer to: 

William Grahame (1808–1890), member of the New South Wales Legislative Assembly for Monaro, 1865–69 and 1872–74
William Grahame (1841–1906), member of the New South Wales Legislative Assembly for Newcastle, 1889–89 and 1891–94
William Calman Grahame (1863–1945), member of the New South Wales Legislative Assembly for Wickham, 1907–20